Šechtl is a surname. Notable people with the surname include:

Ignác Šechtl (1840–1911), pioneer of Czech photography (especially photojournalism) and cinematography
Josef Jindřich Šechtl (1877–1954), Czech photographer who specialized in photojournalism and portrait photography

See also
Šechtl and Voseček, photographic studio founded in Tábor (Bohemia) in 1888 by Ignác Šechtl, and assistant Jan Voseček